The Sony Ericsson Satio (U1) is a smartphone, announced by Sony Ericsson at the Mobile World Congress in Barcelona, Spain on 15 February 2009 as the Idou (pronounced "I do"). It was released on 7 October 2009 in the UK in 3 colour schemes: Black, Silver and Bordeaux (Red).

The focus of the phone is the high quality playback of music and video, as well as photography. The camera is located on the back of the phone, behind a slider and features a xenon flash. On the side of the phone, there is a shutter button,  and a button which allows you to switch between still and video modes. Next to this is a rocker switch for zooming in and out. Also on this side is a button for playback of photos or video. The other side of the phone has a sliding lock button and a covered slot for a MicroSD card.

There is also a front-facing camera for video calling. At the bottom of the touchscreen are three small buttons: green (left), white (centre), and red (right).

In terms of software, Satio uses the Symbian OS 9.4 operating system, which is created collaboratively under the stewardship of the Symbian Foundation as "Symbian^1". It is Sony Ericsson's first non-UIQ Symbian device, after UIQ's development closed down earlier that year. It uses the PlayNow service, Sony Ericsson's mobile content platform, and is part of the company's new Entertainment Unlimited service. In terms of connectivity, it is Wi-Fi-enabled and has a GPS chip for navigation and location-based services. It also supports full Flash for video playback.

The phone was withdrawn from sale in November 2009 by two major British retailers due to complaints from customers. However, the problem was found only in UK editions of the phone and was probably caused by carrier-specific customizations. The following software update released by Sony Ericsson provided a fix and the phone was back for sale at those two retailers.

Sony Ericsson Satio and then Sony Ericsson Vivaz are the latest additions of Sony Ericsson to the Symbian family phones. After that, all Sony Ericsson smartphones run Android.

Features
 16:9, 3.5 inch widescreen
 12.1-megapixel camera, intuitive touch focus, Xenon flash and face and smile detection
 Symbian S60 5th Edition Operating System
 Touch navigation

Dimensions
 112 x 55 x 13 mm

Display
 nHD TFT resistive touchscreen
 16 million colours
 360 x 640 pixels
 3.5"

Memory
 Internal storage: 73 MB
 RAM: 256 MB
 Micro SD memory card support

Connectivity
 aGPS
 Bluetooth technology
 Modem
 PC Synchronization
 USB support
 USB mass storage
 Wi-Fi 802.11 b/g, DLNA
 Google Maps
 PictBridge
 TV Out
 Data Transfer
 Sync

Camera
 12.1 MP (can use 2 MP, 5 MP, 9 MP, 10 MP and 12 MP modes)
 Digital zoom - up to 16x
 4000 × 3000 pixels
 Auto-focus
 Video recording (640x480 @ 30 frame/s, WVGA 864x480 @ 24 frame/s via software update)
 Video light
 Xenon flash
 Video blogging
 Geo-Tagging
 BestPic
 Face detection
 Image stabilizer
 Photo fix
 Picture blogging
 Red-eye reduction
 Smile detection

Internet
 Web browser - WebKit
 Web feeds
 Opera Mobile 10.1 For the Symbian OS
 SkyFire
 Skype

Entertainment
 3D games
 Java
 Media
 Radio - FM radio
 Video Clip
 Video streaming
 YouTube

Messaging
 Email
 Exchange ActiveSync
 Instant messaging
 Picture messaging (MMS)
 Predictive text input
 Sound recorder
 Text messaging (SMS)

Communication
 Polyphonic ringtones
 Speakerphone
 Vibrating Alert
 Video calling

Design
 Auto rotate
 Navigation key
 Picture wallpaper

Organiser
 Alarm clock
 Calculator
 Calendar
 Document editors
 Document readers
 Flight mode
 Handwriting recognition
 Notes
 Phone book
 Touchscreen

CPU
 Texas Instruments OMAP3430 Cortex-A8 @ 600 MHz
 3D Accelerator PowerVR SGX530

See also
OMAP 
Samsung M8910 Pixon12 
Nokia N8
Nokia N97
Nokia X6-00
Symbian S60 
List of Symbian devices 
Sony Ericsson C905
Comparison of smartphones 
Comparison of Symbian devices

References

External links
Official website

Sony Ericsson smartphones
Symbian devices
Mobile phones introduced in 2009